The 108th Attack Squadron is a unit of the New York Air National Guard, stationed at Hancock Field Air National Guard Base, New York. It was most recently activated on 5 October 2014 and assigned to the 174th Operations Group, 174th Attack Wing. The squadron operates the MQ-9 Reaper.

History

On 25 June 2020, one of the squadron's MQ-9s crashed at Hancock Field Air National Guard Base after losing engine power. An investigation determined that the cause of the accident was pilot error when it was found that the pilot accidentally cut the fuel supply to the drone's engine.

Lineage
 Received federal recognition as the 108th Air Control and Warning Squadron on 22 Nov 1948
 Redesignated 108th Aircraft Control and Warning Flight in 1960
 Redesignated 108th Tactical Control Squadron in 1965
 Redesignated 108th Air Control Squadron in 1992
 Inactivated on 16 February 1994
 Redesignated 108th Attack Squadron and activated on 5 October 2014

Assignments
 152nd Tactical Control Group (later, 152nd Air Control Group), unknown
 174th Operations Group, 5 October 2014 – present

Stations
 Hancock Field Air National Guard Base, New York, 1948
 Grenier Air Force Base, New Hampshire, 1951
 Pepperrell Air Force Base, Newfoundland, 1952
 Sembach/Hamm, Germany, 1961
 RAF Gütersloh, Germany, 1962
 Hancock Field Air National Guard Base, New York, 1962
 Langley Air Force Base, Virginia, 1983
 Hancock Field Air National Guard Base, New York, 5 October 2014 – present

References 

Squadrons of the United States Air National Guard
Military units and formations in New York (state)
Attack squadrons of the United States Air Force